The Citizen Card (Portuguese: Cartão de cidadão) or CC is an identity card issued by the Portuguese government to its citizens.  The card replaces several previous documents, including the Bilhete de Identidade (BI; Identity Card), Social Security card, National Health Service card, Taxpayer card and voter registration card, in one secure card. The Citizen Card was first issued in the Azores in mid-2006.

However,  BIs continued to be issued in some cases.

The Citizen card is a valid travel document within all of Europe (except Belarus, Russia, Ukraine and United Kingdom) as well as Egypt, French overseas territories, Georgia, Montserrat (max 14 days), Turkey and on organized tours to Tunisia. However, to enter to Egypt visa is required through the e-visa system or upon arrival (passport photo is required on the arrival).

Requirements for a Citizen Card photo 

A photo is taken by the system used to issue the Citizen Card.

Objectives
The main reason to introduce the new card was to reduce the number of separate documents required by citizens in dealings with the various institutions of the state. The CC is a smart card with a data storage chip capable of storing encrypted personal data. According to the Portuguese government, this device guarantees its privacy: for example, stored medical information cannot be accessed by officials with access to the financial database of the citizen, to prevent abuse of power in obtaining data and protecting citizens' privacy.

Another problem with the Bilhete de Identidade was that it was widely counterfeited. In addition to introducing the newer, more secure, CC, from 2008 identity documents could no longer be issued by Portuguese consulates as previously; identity documents could only be issued in Lisbon (although applied for elsewhere).

Other identity documents
In many circumstances, a passport or driver's license can still be used as an identification document. However, the "identity card" or "citizen card" is required by the Portuguese authorities. Foreigners, including European Union nationals, must carry a passport or valid identity card of their country of origin, and show it whenever required by officials. In the future however, as part of the Simplex + 2018, a new "card of citizenship" (cartão de cidadão) for foreigners residing in Portugal will arrive, which will include tax identification, social security and the national health system.

Appearance

The card is of similar size and appearance to a credit card. It contains a variety of information about the card holder.

The front of the card
 Card holder's photo
 Surname(s)
 Given Name(s)
 Sex
 Height
 Nationality
 Date of Birth
 Civil Identification Number
 Document number
 Expiry Date
 Card holder's signature

The back of the card
 Filiation
 Tax number
 Social Security number
 National Health Service number
 Optical reading area

On the chip
 Digital certificates (card's authentication and electronic signature)
 Same data as the optical reading area but in digital format
 Address and other information (the system is  expandable)

Issuance to Brazilian nationals
Since the conclusion of the Equality Statute between Brazil and Portugal (Estatuto da Igualdade entre Brasil e Portugal) between the two nations at Porto Seguro on 21 April 2001, Portuguese and Brazilian citizens are considered to have identical rights and privileges across both countries. Accordingly, a Brazilian national may apply for and be issued Citizen Card in the same style as would be issued to a Portuguese national, except that the "Nacionalidade" (nationality) field shows "BRA" to indicate the bearer's Brazilian citizenship, and the back of the card carries the  supplementary remark "CIDADÃO BRASILEIRO AO ABRIGO DO TRATADO DE PORTO SEGURO - BRAZILIAN CITIZEN UNDER PORTO SEGURO AGREEMENT".

Additionally, because Brazilian citizenship alone is not sufficient to allow a person to make use of the European Union's provisions for the freedom of personal movement, these Citizen Cards are marked "NÃO SERVE DE DOCUMENTO DE VIAGEM / NOT VALID AS A TRAVEL DOCUMENT", instead of the machine-readable zone that would be found on a Portuguese citizen's card.

See also
 Bilhete de Identidade
 National identity cards in the European Economic Area

References

External links
 Official government page for the Citizen Card (in Portuguese)

Government of Portugal
Portugal